Paetsch is a surname. Notable people with the surname include:

Günther Johannes Paetsch (1929–1997), cellist
Hans Paetsch (1909–2002), German actor
Jessica Rose Paetsch (born 1993), American pair skater
Johann Sebastian Paetsch (born 1964), American cellist
Julie Paetsch (born 1988), Canadian hockey and football player
Michaela Paetsch (1961-2023), American violinist
Nathan Paetsch (born 1983), Canadian ice hockey player
Otto Paetsch (1909–1945), Standartenführer (Colonel) in the Waffen SS
Priscilla Paetsch (1931-2017), American violinist and composer